Shabanov is a Russian masculine surname, its feminine counterpart is Shabanova. Notable people with the surname include:

 Andrei Shabanov (born 1976), Russian football and futsal player
Anna Shabanova (1848–1932), Russian pediatrician and women's rights activist
 Artem Shabanov (born 1992), Ukrainian football player
Dmitri Shabanov (born 1964), Russian Olympic sailor
Ismail Shabanov, President of the Talysh diaspora of Russia
Konstantin Shabanov (born 1989), Russian hurdler
Rafiga Shabanova (born 1943), Azerbaijani handball player
Sergei Shabanov (born 1974), Belarusian ice hockey goaltender
Svyatoslav Shabanov (born 1993), Russian football defender
 Yuri Shabanov (1937–2010), Russian chess grandmaster

Russian-language surnames